Alpha Sigma Phi Philippines, Inc. (commonly known as Alphans) is a co-ed service fraternity with 34 active undergraduate chapters, colonies and interest groups.

History
From anecdotal sources, it appears that four groups used the Greek letters "Alpha Sigma Phi" as their fraternal name.

Gregorio Araneta University Foundation, Caloocan City, 1952 
Little is known about this group, except that one of its members was Bobby Ledesma, a TV host prominent in the '70s. They emerged when conflicts arose between their members and Alphans who studied at GAUF. The groups remained separate organizations. No record shows that this group was invited to the national convention in 1972. The group that affiliated with ASP Philippines is now known as the Alpha Nu Chapter.

Central Mindanao University, Musuan, Bukidnon, 1959 
This group was organized by Tomas Gavarra, with the assistance of Ramon del Carmen as Faculty Adviser. This group used the name "Agricultural Students of the Philippines" and its acronym ASP was represented by the Greek letters Alpha Sigma Phi.

Some of its members organized chapters in other schools. A chapter was established at Rafael Palma College in Tagbilaran City, now University of Bohol. This group known as Theta Chapter played a role in developing ties with the Silliman group which eventually gave impetus to the formation of a national organization.

University of the East Ramon Magsaysay Memorial Medical Center, Sta. Mesa, Manila, 1959 
This group claims to be the oldest fraternity of the University Medical Center. No information described the origins of its name. No record shows that it was invited to the first national convention in 1972.

Silliman University, Dumaguete City, 1965 
The chapter was organized by Manuel Momongan. The group tookthe name Alpha Sigma Phi. No record shows that its organization was with the knowledge and authorization of ASP USA.

It appears that the group appropriated the symbols of ASP USA. This practice was spurred when ASP USA and ASP Philippines forged the “Heads of Agreement” and established “Alpha Sigma Phi International.” This group served as the convenor of the first national convention in 1972 at Silliman University.

First National Convention, Silliman University, Dumaguete City, 1972 
Some of these groups grew and organized chapters in other colleges. Their respective members met and interacted.

In 1972, at Silliman University, the first national convention was held and the first set of national officers were elected. Only chapters originating from SU and CMU were represented in that gathering. Greek-letter names were assigned to existing chapters

During the 1978 convention in Davao City, the Greek-letter names of the chapters were updated and approved.

In 1980 the national organization was registered with the Securities and Exchange Commission using the name “Alpha Sigma Phi – Philippines, International Collegiate Service Organization, Inc.”

Beginning in 1972 the national organization met in national conventions, leadership conferences, regional conclaves, chapter and association meetings, spreading the reach and scope of Alpha Sigma Phi Philippines across the world.

Relationship with Alpha Sigma Phi of the United States
In 1984, Alpha Sigma Phi of the Philippines entered into a "Heads of Agreement" outlining a relationship between the two countries. This agreement outlined mechanisms by which the groups would share information, assist in solving mutual problems. It established the "International Council of Alpha Sigma Phi".

The purpose of this relationship was to foster a sense of international brotherhood. Beyond the sharing of open publications such as the Tomahawk, chapter operations manuals and the like, little contact between the two organizations developed.

However, the recommendation of the US Grand Council of Alpha Sigma Phi Fraternity were that the 2008 Grand Chapter would nullify the 1984 Heads of Agreement between the two, that the national staff of the US chapter inform the Filipino chapter of this nullification and that it be directed to cease use of the group's marks and symbols in accordance with US trademark law.

The 2008 Grand Chapter Delegates approved the motion to dissolve the 1984 Heads of Agreement between the two.

In 2010, the "International Council of Alpha Sigma Phi" was revived by both fraternities and linkages between the two were established. Through frequent exchange visits by both parties, they agreed to reaffiliate.

On November 14, 2013, the US ASP Grand Council restated their withdrawal from the Heads of Agreement signed in 1984, severing formal ties between the two organizations.  US ASP retained all rights to intellectual property, marks, and symbols associated with the fraternity.

Pledge Education Program (No-Hazing Policy)
In 1982, the fraternity implemented a form of acceptance of new prospective members which is known as the Pledge Education Program (PEP).

References

External links
Alpha Sigma Phi Philippines, Inc.
Alpha Sigma Phi Philippines, International Collegiate Service Organization, Inc.

Fraternities and sororities in the Philippines
Student organizations established in 1959
1959 establishments in the Philippines